The Central District of Lamerd County is a district (bakhsh) in Lamerd County, Fars Province, Iran. At the 2006 census, its population was 43,371, in 9,523 households.  The District has one city: Lamerd. The District has three rural districts (dehestan): Chah Varz Rural District, Howmeh Rural District, and Sigar Rural District.

References 

Lamerd County
Districts of Fars Province